Ant (Hannah Washington) is an Image Universe comic book superhero. She first appeared in Ant #1 (March 2004), published by Arcana Studios, as Hanna Washington. Ant was created by Mario Gully and is currently published by Image Comics, written by Erik Larsen. Ant appears in Ant, Savage Dragon and Spawn.

Publication history
The Ant comic was published by Arcana Studios in March 2004. The creator and artist, Mario Gully, has stated that the concept of Ant was created while he was incarcerated in 1996 for attempted armed robbery. Gully says that one day he was looking through a barred cell window and a tiny ant crawled in from the outside. He later vowed to change his life and make something out of himself. He then created Ant.

Vol. 1 (Arcana Studios; 2004)

The first volume, published by Arcana Studios and titled "Days Like These", ran for 4 issues before moving to Image Comics.

Story
The original Arcana miniseries followed 8-year-old Hannah Washington, a lonely young girl continually tormented and bullied at school. Her father, apparently an accountant—and later on, a blue-collar employee—by profession, is made a suspect in an armed robbery and is taken into custody. To escape the harsh realities of her life, she writes in her diary stories of an alter-ego: an adult version of herself who is a superhero known as Ant.

Hannah appears to know more about the world than she ought to and often has the personality of an emotionally unstable young adult, and her new principal takes interest in her as a result.

She ends up unintentionally dropping her diary, and it is read and returned by her friend Stephen, who later on appears as "Gadget Man" in Ant's Cockroach battle, the events of which we are allowed to follow whenever Hannah's diary is read or written into.

Hannah's father was released from custody but eventually, his home gets raided as the authorities apparently have the evidence they need to put him away. Hannah is found foaming at the mouth, having a seizure on the floor.

The son of the man he allegedly killed pushes for the death penalty—which would normally be too severe a punishment, but due to his influence, his demands are met and Hannah's father is sentenced to death.

We then find Hannah's mother, Betty, working as a cabaret dancer of sorts, had left many years ago and she makes an unwelcome step back into Hannah's life, since Hannah's father requested her to. However, after reading her diary Betty comes to the conclusion that it was a mistake to leave.

Meanwhile, Ant is beaten by the Cockroach and loses her exoskeleton. Stephen rescues her and gives her a can which recharges her blood-sugar and her exoskeleton grows back. She then defeats the Cockroach.

Hannah finally manages to obtain information using Ant to clear her father's name—it turns out that the murdered man's son, and Betty's rich lover, was the actual culprit; but he is shot dead by the police when he is about to kill Betty, who has just discovered his guilt. Hannah's happiness at getting her parents together is short-lived, though. When told by the policewoman Inez that it is impossible for Ant to have helped Hannah as she had said Ant was who she would be in the future, she blacks out, and eventually ends up awakening in a straitjacket confined possibly in a sanitarium somewhat into her middle teens. The news of her revival brings forth a visit from her mother, who is in bereavement when informing Hannah of her father's apparent demise. This piece of info shocks Hannah. She manages to escape, leaving behind one of the cans she used to regenerate her exoskeleton in her story, which leads on to the second volume.

Vol. 2 (Image Comics; 2005–2007)
The second volume, published by Image Comics and titled "Reality Bites", featured heavy hitters such as Spawn and the Savage Dragon as co-stars, featuring an Invincible plush doll. This series ran for 11 issues.

Issue #8 became infamous for a scene where a stripper removes her underwear, exposing her posterior. The creator later apologized for the scene.

Story
An adult Hannah Washington wakes up in a mental institution, where she has been told all her memories are the result of a coping mechanism described as a "juvenile power fantasy." But, little by little, her fantasies of her life as Ant become more and more real.

Vol. 3 (Big City Comics; 2008)
Ant: Unleashed is the third volume of the series, released in 2008 by Big City Comics. This run focuses on a more mature version of Ant. Six issues were scheduled, but only the first three were published as of May 2008, later issues being cancelled without a resolution to the story. Ant subsequently appeared in the spin-off miniseries Omega One, featuring Shi.

Vol. 2 continued (Image Comics; 2021)
In 2012 ANT creator Mario Gully sold ANT to Savage Dragon creator Erik Larsen. Fourteen years after its previous issue was published, Ant's second volume will be concluded with its 12th issue in June of 2021 and a new series will be launched in the future.

Powers and abilities
Ant possesses the typical enhanced speed and strength of many bug-based superheroes, but in addition she has bladed antennae which provide her with superhuman-level senses and weapon application. One of the more interesting aspects of the character is her exoskeleton, which appears to be regenerated by use of her blood-sugar. When her armor wears down, it breaks off rather quickly and she must recharge her blood-sugar in order to regenerate it. She seems to use some kind of spray-can with an ant symbol to do this.

References

External links
 
 "Year ending storyline to change Ant forever!". Monsters and Critics. July 19, 2006.

African-American superheroes
Black people in comics
Comics characters introduced in 2004
2004 comics debuts
Fictional ants
Fictional Irish people
Image Comics titles
Image Comics female superheroes
Image Comics characters with superhuman strength
Irish superheroes
Savage Dragon characters